Karapınar Field is a volcanic field in central Anatolia, Asian Turkey.

Geography
The volcanic area is located near the city of Karapınar, in the Karapınar District of Konya Province.

Features
The basaltic Karapınar Volcanic Field consists of five cinder cones, two lava fields, and several explosion craters and maars.

Meke Dağı is surrounded by Meke Gölü, a crater lake.

See also

 Geology of Turkey
 List of volcanoes in Turkey
 Karaca Dağ near Diyarbakır

References 

 

Volcanoes of Turkey
Volcanic fields
Geology of Turkey
Maars of Turkey
Cinder cones
Volcanic crater lakes
Landforms of Konya Province
Lava fields
Important Bird Areas of Turkey